Leaving You may refer to:

"Leaving You", song by Savoy (group)
"Leaving You", song by Tommy Heavenly from I Kill My Heart